Coalbrookdale railway station is a disused station at Coalbrookdale in Shropshire, England. The station was situated on the now mothballed freight-only line between Buildwas Junction and Lightmoor Junction. The station buildings are now used by the Green Wood Centre.

The Telford Steam Railway has aspirations to take possession of the up track passing through the station as part of its southern extension.

The station building at Longville (another station on the Wenlock, Craven Arms and Lightmoor Extension railway) was a similar but reduced version of that at Coalbookdale.

Coalbrookdale railway station is a waypoint on the South Telford Heritage Trail.

References

Further reading

Disused railway stations in Shropshire
Ironbridge Gorge
Coalbrookdale
Former Great Western Railway stations
Railway stations in Great Britain opened in 1864
Railway stations in Great Britain closed in 1962